Unione Sportiva Ancona, commonly referred to as Ancona, is an Italian football club based in Ancona, Marche.

The club is widely considered to be the heir of defunct former Serie A club Ancona, with whom it shares its official historical logo.

History
The club was founded in 2021 as the merger of Serie C club S.S. Matelica Calcio 1921, from the city of Matelica, with Ancona-based Eccellenza club Anconitana.

As part of the merger, all logos and naming rights of Matelica were given away to Prima Categoria club G.S. Corrado Fabiani Matelica, formally owned by chairman Mauro Canil's wife and which is now to be legally considered the heir of Matelica itself, whereas, as part of the merger, Anconitana brought the original footballing logo, as well as the rights to use the Stadio del Conero in the city of Ancona. The new club's board will be the same as Matelica's, with Mauro Canil as majority shareholder and chairman, whereas Anconitana's original owner Stefano Marconi will be linked to Ancona-Matelica as the club's official main sponsor for the following five years. The club board stated their aim to have the official name changed to just "Ancona" by 2022, pending approval by the Italian Football Federation.

On 30 March 2022, Malaysian billionaire entrepreneur Tony Tiong, nephew of Tiong Hiew King, was announced as the new majority shareholder, after having acquired 95% of the club's shares. By the end of the season, the club changed its denomination to Unione Sportiva Ancona, thus severing its association with Matelica altogether.

Colors and badge 
The team's color are white and red.

Stadium

Ancona-Matelica play their home matches at the 25,000 capacity, Stadio del Conero, located in the city of Ancona.

Players

Current squad
As of 31 January 2023.

Out on loan

References 

 
Football clubs in Italy
Football clubs in the Marche
Ancona
Serie C clubs
Association football clubs established in 2021